The 1975 Cricket World Cup (officially called the Prudential Cup '75) was the inaugural men's Cricket World Cup, and the first major tournament in the history of One Day International (ODI) cricket. Organised by the International Cricket Conference (ICC), it took place in England between 7 June and 21 June 1975.

The tournament was sponsored by Prudential Assurance Company and had eight participating countries: the six Test-playing teams of the time – Australia, England, India, New Zealand, Pakistan, the West Indies – and the two leading Associate nations at the time – Sri Lanka and East Africa. The teams were divided into two groups of four, with each team playing each other in their group once; the top two from each group qualified for the semi-finals, with the winners of these matches meeting in the final. Each match consisted of 60 overs per team and was played in traditional white clothing and with red balls; all were played and ended in daylight.

England and New Zealand finished as the top two teams in Group A, while the West Indies finished top of the Group B table ahead of Australia as the four teams qualified through to the semi-finals. After Australia defeated England and the West Indies defeated New Zealand in the semi-finals, the West Indies which came into the tournament as favourites, defeated Australia in the final at Lord's by 17 runs to become the first World Cup winners. New Zealand batsman, Glenn Turner was the top run-scorer for the tournament with 333 runs, whilst Australian bowler Gary Gilmour was the top wicket-taker with 11 wickets despite only playing in the final two matches.

Background
The first multilateral cricket competition at international level was the 1912 Triangular Tournament in England. This was played between the three test nations at the time – England, Australia and South Africa. The concept was later dropped because of inclement weather and a lack of public interest. The first one-day match to occur was in 1962 when four English county cricket teams filled in a gap to play in a limited overs knockout competition. It was won by Northamptonshire who defeated Leicestershire by five wickets.

The limited-over format had been used in what sponsors marketed as a 'World Cricket Cup' in England in 1966 and 1967, contested between England, a Rest of the World XI, and a touring team (the West Indies in 1966 and Pakistan in 1967). The marketing of the event was clearly influenced by the hosting of the 1966 FIFA World Cup in the same country. The 1966 'World Cricket Cup' was won by England, that in 1967 by the Rest of the World. A report in the Cricketer implied that the last such match in this "Triangular Tournament", between Pakistan and the Rest of the World was neither well-attended nor taken entirely seriously: "It was a pity that a larger crowd was not present ... Sobers took the Cup and the World Xl took the gold medals. They must have enjoyed their holiday".

It was not until 1971 that the first official One Day International took place at the Melbourne Cricket Ground (MCG) as a replacement for the third test of the 1970–71 Ashes series between Australia and England. This was due to a deluge of rain that had affected the match for the first three days of the test. The match was a forty over match with each over being eight deliveries. After England made 190 from 39.4 overs, Australia chased the target at a steady rate to secure the match with 42 balls remaining. Two years later at Lord's during the 1973 Women's Cricket World Cup, plans were made for a men's tournament to take place in 1975. The tournament was planned to involve all the Test nations at the time in two group stages with the top two in each group qualifying for the knockout stage with the final at Lord's.

Format
The format of the 1975 Cricket World Cup had the eight teams split into two groups of four, with each team playing the rest of their group once. These matches took place from 7 to 14 June. The top two teams from each group then advanced to the semi-finals on 18 June, where the winners qualified for the final at Lord's on 21 June. If any of the matches had rain throughout the day, the teams could use one of their two reserve days that had been set for each match. The first World Cup saw seven venues being used across England.

Participants

Eight teams were invited to compete at the World Cup. Six of those nations were full members of the International Cricket Council (ICC), while the other two – Sri Lanka and East Africa – were invited to fill the remaining two spots. South Africa was meant to be one of the teams in the tournament, but due to the apartheid laws in the country, the team had to withdraw from competing until the 1992 edition.

Venues
The announcement of the venues began on 26 July 1973 when the ICC revealed that the tournament would be played with Lord's selected as the venue for the final. The rest of the venues were revealed on 5 November 1974 with the scheduling for the tournament being announced alongside the five county tournaments that would take place during the 1975 season. Headingley and The Oval were confirmed as the semi-final hosts.

Pre-tournament

Squads

Preparations
Heading into the first Cricket World Cup, the Ladbrokes betting agency had the West Indies as the favourites at 9–4. This was followed by England at 11–4 with Pakistan and Australia in third and fourth respectively. East Africa was last in the betting odds at 1500–1. Before the tournament, most of the teams played in warm-up matches against English county sides to get used to the English conditions with most of the national teams getting wins. Only East Africa, Sri Lanka and India lost at least one warm-up match before the tournament. Only Australia did not have any warm-up matches in England; their tour of Canada saw them lose to Eastern Canada and draw with Toronto before heading to England.

Eight days before the World Cup, the ICC declared in a unanimous decision that any of the balls that went over a batsman's head would be called wide due to the fast short-pitched bowling.

Group stage

Summary
The opening round of matches took place on 7 June with four matches being played. The match at Lord's saw England deliver the highest score by a team in the 60 over match with 334 runs being scored. Dennis Amiss top scored for the English with 137 from 147 balls helped by Keith Fletcher and Chris Old who each recorded a half-century. In response, Sunil Gavaskar batted through the entire innings for only 36 runs in which Gulabrai Ramchand thought that he was doing some batting practice. Australia opened their campaign with a win against Pakistan at Headingley with a 73-run victory. This was due to Dennis Lillee's five-wicket haul which brought Pakistan's hope of a win crashing down as they collapsed from 181 for four to be all out for 205. Earlier, Ross Edwards top scored for Australia with 80 as he aided the Australians in getting 94 runs from the last 13 overs to bring Australia to 278 for seven from their 60 overs. The other two matches saw easy wins for the West Indies and New Zealand. For Glenn Turner, he occupied the crease during the whole New Zealand innings as he top scored with 171 as New Zealand won by 180 runs over East Africa. The West Indies took a nine-wicket victory over Sri Lanka who became the first team to score under 100 runs in a limited overs One Day International (ODI).

Despite missing two players due to operation – Asif Iqbal – and examinations – Imran Khan – Pakistan was not fazed by the missing players in the second round of games with the team scoring 266 for seven from their 60 overs with standing captain Majid Khan top scoring for Pakistan with 60. In response, the West Indies fell to 166 for eight which included a period of three wickets for only 10 runs as Bernard Julien, Clive Lloyd and Keith Boyce all losing their wickets. But the last wicket pair of Deryck Murray and Andy Roberts stole the match away as the West Indies won by a wicket off the final over. The other match in Group B saw Australia claim their second victory, but it was not all smooth with the Australian captain Ian Chappell remarking in an interview that the English media was trying to unsettle Australia's plans due to the Jeff Thomson no-ball problem with Chappell saying: "I've seen this sort of thing before in England". On the field, Alan Turner scored a century as Australia ended with 328 with Sri Lanka falling 52 runs short as John Mason from The Daily Telegraph stated that they might not have many new admirers with their short ball stuff sending two Sri Lankan batsman to hospital. Group A saw two convincing wins to England and India. At Trent Bridge, Keith Fletcher top scored for England with 131 as he guided the English to their second victory and going to the lead of the group table with an 80-run win over New Zealand. The other match in Group A saw 720 spectators observe India record a 10-wicket victory with Madan Lal taking three wickets for India in which East Africa fell only 120.

With the match sold out four days in advance, the West Indies took on Australia to see who would finish top of Group B. With the ball swinging in the air, the pair of Rod Marsh and Ross Edwards guided Australia to 192 with a 99-run partnership for the sixth wicket after Australia fell to 61 for seven. In response, the West Indies went on to take a seven-wicket victory with Alvin Kallicharran top scoring with 78, which included a period of 31 runs of nine Dennis Lillee deliveries as the West Indies finished top of Group B. Pakistan ended their tournament with a 192-run victory over Sri Lanka at Trent Bridge with half centuries to Zaheer Abbas, Majid Khan and Sadiq Mohammad. In Group A, New Zealand sealed their spot in the semi-finals with a four-wicket victory over India off the back of a century from Glenn Turner as he hit twelve fours on his way to an unbeaten innings of 114. The other match in Group A saw England clinch a 196-run victory over East Africa; England scored 290/5 from their 60 overs off the back of a 158-run opening partnership between Dennis Amiss and Barry Wood before a bowling attack led by John Snow (taking 4 for 11 from his 12 overs) ran through the East Africans, who were bowled out for 94 in 52.3 overs. Only Ramesh Sethi offered much resistance, lasting for 32 overs to score 30.

Group A

Group B

Knockout stage

The knockout stage of the Cricket World Cup consisted of two single-elimination rounds leading to a final. If the match was delayed due to rain there were two reserve days to play out the match.

Semi-finals
The first semi-final was between England and Australia at Headingley. For Australia, their one change in bringing in Gary Gilmour for Ashley Mallett proved critical in booking Australia's spot into the final. This was due to the grassy pitch that both captains would criticise after the match. After Australia elected to field first, Gilmour took six wickets for 14 runs as he had England at 37 for seven after he bowled his 12 overs. Mike Denness attempted to bring England back but would lose his wicket as England fell for 93. In the run-chase, Australia collapsed to 39 for six before Gilmour partnered with Doug Walters as they chased the remaining runs to earn Australia a berth in the final.

The second semi-final was between the West Indies and New Zealand at The Oval. Batting first, New Zealand reached 92 for only one loss at the lunch break. After lunch though, they collapsed to 158 with Geoff Howarth top scoring for New Zealand with 51, while Bernard Julien was the top wicket taker with four wickets. In the run chase, a 125-run second wicket partnership between Alvin Kallicharran (top scoring with 72) and Gordon Greenidge (55 runs) laid the foundation for a five-wicket victory with Richard Collinge being the only bowler to be troublesome for the West Indies with figures of three for 28 runs from his twelve overs.

Final

The final match on 21 June was sold out three days beforehand. With the West Indies being favourites for the match, they were asked by Ian Chappell to bat first and would go on to score 291 for eight wickets from 60 overs. After being given a second chance from a Ross Edwards dropped chance at mid-wicket, Clive Lloyd went on to top score for the West Indies with 102. Gary Gilmour was the best of the Australian bowlers with five wickets for 48 runs. In response, Ian Chappell scored a half-century to set up the foundation for Australia before three run-outs from the hands of Viv Richards put the pressure on Australia as they collapsed to 233 for nine. A final-wicket partnership of 41 from Dennis Lillee and Jeff Thompson brought Australia within 18 runs of victory. But a fifth run-out of the innings saw Australia bowled out for 274 and would see the West Indies win by 17 runs, claiming the first men's World Cup.

Statistics

Glenn Turner of New Zealand ended the tournament as the leading run scorer for the 1975 edition with his 333 runs coming in four games which included a unbeaten 171 against East Africa, which was also the highest score of the tournament. In second place was English player Dennis Amiss with Pakistan's Majid Khan rounding out the top three. Australian player Gary Gilmour was the tournament's leading wicket taker with 11 wickets from his two games, which included the best tournament figures in the semi-finals when he took six wickets for 14 against England. Bernard Julien and Keith Boyce (both from the West Indies) finished in second place, both getting 10 wickets for the tournament.

Most runs

Most wickets

Further reading

References

External links
 1975 Cricket World Cup from ESPNcricinfo

 
World
Cricket World Cup tournaments
International cricket competitions from 1970–71 to 1975
International sports competitions hosted by England
Cricket World Cup